Edward Orval "Ned" Gourdin (August 10, 1897 – July 22, 1966) was an American athlete and jurist. He was the first man in history to make 25 feet in the long jump and the first African-American and the first Native-American (Seminole) to be appointed a Superior Court judge in New England.

He won the silver medal in the long jump at the 1924 Summer Olympics in Paris, France. Following his return from the Olympics, Gourdin was admitted to the bar. He left his law practice in 1935 to serve as Assistant United States Attorney from Massachusetts. In 1951 he was appointed to the Roxbury District Court. On July 22, 1958, he was appointed by governor Foster Furcolo to serve on the Massachusetts Superior Court, the Commonwealth's second highest court. He remained on the court until his death on July 22, 1966.

Gourdin attended Harvard University, where he was a member of Alpha Phi Alpha fraternity.

See also
List of African-American jurists

References

1897 births
1966 deaths
Sportspeople from Jacksonville, Florida
American male long jumpers
Harvard University alumni
Olympic silver medalists for the United States in track and field
Athletes (track and field) at the 1924 Summer Olympics
World record setters in athletics (track and field)
Assistant United States Attorneys
Lawyers from Boston
Sportspeople from Quincy, Massachusetts
Massachusetts Superior Court justices
Medalists at the 1924 Summer Olympics
20th-century American judges
20th-century American lawyers
Seminole people
Native American sportspeople